M cells may refer to:

 Microfold cell
 Magnocellular cell
 Motilin secreting cells of the gastrointestinal tract